Julie Hjorth-Hansen (born 10 June 1984) is a Danish former swimmer, who specialized in freestyle and individual medley events. She placed among the top 10 swimmers in the 200 m individual medley at the 2008 Summer Olympics, and has won a bronze medal at the 2004 European Short Course Swimming Championships in Vienna, Austria in 2:13.03.

Hjorth-Hansen competed for the Danish swimming squad in the women's 200 m individual medley at the 2008 Summer Olympics in Beijing. Leading up to the Games, she cleared a FINA A-standard entry time of 2:12.74 at the Mare Nostrum Arena International Meet in Canet-en-Roussillon, France. Hjorth-Hansen dipped under the 2:12 barrier in the prelims to secure her spot for the semifinals, checking in with a Danish record and fifth fastest time of 2:11.99. Followed by the next morning's session, Hjorth-Hansen failed to advance to the final, as she finished her semifinal run with a tenth-place overall time in 2:12.26. Hjorth-Hansen also teamed up with Louise Mai Jansen, Micha Østergaard, and Lotte Friis in the 4 × 200 m freestyle relay. Swimming the lead-off leg, Hjorth-Hansen recorded a split of 1:59.16, and the Danish team finished the preliminary heats in tenth overall with a new national record of 8:00.81.

At the 2009 FINA World Championships in Rome, Italy, Hjorth-Hansen broke two new Danish records. In the 200 m individual medley, she placed fifth in the final by 0.18 of a second behind Great Britain's Hannah Miley, breaking the 2:10 barrier and lowering her record to 2:09.73. She also helped her Danish team (Jansen, Ostergaard, and Friis) to dip under an eight-minute barrier and broke a new record of 7:55.56 in the 4 × 200 m freestyle relay, but finished only in twelfth place overall from the preliminary heats.

References

External links
NBC Olympics Profile

1984 births
Living people
Danish female swimmers
Olympic swimmers of Denmark
Swimmers at the 2008 Summer Olympics
Danish female medley swimmers
Danish female freestyle swimmers
People from Rudersdal Municipality
Sportspeople from the Capital Region of Denmark